Annie Miller (born January 19, 1977) is a retired American professional tennis player. Miller attained a career high singles ranking of 40 on 21 September 1998. She is best known for being the first opponent of Serena Williams in Williams' professional career, Miller winning the match 6–1, 6–1. She also has wins over Lindsay Davenport, Mary Pierce, Kimiko Date and Jana Novotná.

Early life and interests
Miller was raised in Michigan.

Tennis career
Miller began playing tennis for fun when she was five years old.  At 16, she received a scholarship to attend the former Nick Bolletieri Tennis Academy.  After a successful junior career, she began playing the USTA circuit at age 15, and at 18, she began playing tennis professionally.  She played right-handed (double handed backhand).

Career end
At the time when Miller started thriving in professional tennis – at the age of 21, a mere four years into her career – she took an indefinite leave of absence from the Women’s Tennis Association.   This was the best season of her career, with her solid run to the third round of the U.S. Open, which was her personal best, ranking her Number 43 in the world.

Miller also beat both Lindsay Davenport (who was Number 7 in the world) and Mary Pierce, which earned her reputation for being a “young player on the rise.”  When she played at the Open against Monica Seles – a game that was televised – she accrued a whole slew of new fans, due to her impressive playing and attractiveness.

After the 1998 US Open, Miller made the decision to attend college at University of Michigan, where she received a Bachelor in Business Administration (BBA) and Master of Accounting degree at University of Michigan Ross School of Business.  Following her tennis career, she worked at Pricewaterhouse Coopers, Fenway Sports Group (now Fenway Sports Management), and adidas.

Awards
In a 1991 junior competition, Miller won the U.S. National 16s and 1992 Easter Bowl 18s. The following year she received the Clairol/WTA Tennis Scholarship at the U.S. Open.  Two years later, she received the 1994 International Hall of Fame Sportsmanship Award.

Teams
Miller was a member of both the U.S. Maureen Connolly Brinker Cup team and the U.S. National Team in 1991–92.

Education
In 1995, Miller graduated from Bradenton Academy with honors. Following her tennis career, she studied business at the University of Michigan.

References

American female tennis players
1977 births
Living people
Tennis people from Michigan
Ross School of Business alumni
21st-century American women